Sigurður Þorbjörn Ingimundarson (born 14 June 1966) is an Icelandic former basketball coach and player. He is the winningest coach in Icelandic basketball history for both genders, both in terms of national championships and career wins.

In 2009, Sigurður was hired as the head coach of Solna Vikings. He left after only two games due to a disagreement with the board regarding how to build up the team, claiming he was not happy with the boards insistence on adding more American players to ensure short-term success.

Sigurður last coached Keflavík in the Úrvalsdeild karla before stepping down for health reasons in October 2016.

Personal life
Sigurður is the younger brother of Valur Ingimundarson, the highest scoring player in the Icelandic Úrvalsdeild history, and the uncle of basketball player Valur Orri Valsson.

References

External links
 KKÍ.is player Premier League profile

1966 births
Living people
Sigurdur Ingimundarson
Sigurdur Ingimundarson
Sigurdur Ingimundarson
Sigurdur Ingimundarson
Sigurdur Ingimundarson
Sigurdur Ingimundarson
Sigurdur Ingimundarson
Sigurdur Ingimundarson
Sigurdur Ingimundarson